"Kiki" (alternately kiking or a ki) is a term which started in Black Gay American social culture, and currently, is loosely defined as a gathering of friends for the purpose of gossiping and chit-chat, and later made more famous in the song "Let's Have a Kiki" by the Scissor Sisters.

Previous Definitions 
While the current definition of the word does find its roots in Ball-room culture, the word kiki has been a part of the LGBTQ community for much longer. In the 1930s, kiki first came to be used as slang for a gay man that could be both passive and active during sexual intercourse. Between the 1940s and 50s this definition was extended to lesbians that were comfortable as either "butch" or "fem" presenting as well as women who did not choose to identify. When it made its way into drag culture, "kiki" came into its modern use as it meant having fun at a party or other social gathering, especially if there was gossip involved. In the 1990 documentary Paris is Burning, it was used to mean the sound of laughter.

From ballroom culture, kiki began to bud off into its own scene, one that is particularly friendly towards Black/Latino members of the LGBTQ community, as depicted in the 2016 movie, Kiki. Post 2010, thanks in part to the release of "Let's Have a Kiki" by the Scissor Sisters, and the popularization of Drag Culture through RuPaul's Drag Race, the word has found its way into mainstream culture as well.

See also
 Ball culture
 Paris is Burning (film)
 Kiki (2016 film)

General:
 African-American LGBT community

References

 

LGBT terminology
Erotic parties
LGBT African-American culture
LGBT Hispanic and Latino American culture
Ball culture